Brazen is a 2022 American thriller film directed by Monika Mitchell. It is based on Nora Roberts' 1988 novel Brazen Virtue. The film stars Alyssa Milano, Sam Page, and Matthew Finlan.

Brazen was released on January 13, 2022, by Netflix.

Plot

Cast
 Alyssa Milano as Grace Miller
 Sam Page as Ed Jennings
 Malachi Weir as Ben
 Matthew Finlan as Jerald Baxter/Hacker
 Colleen Wheeler as Senator Baxter
 Lossen Chambers as Stacey White
 Emilie Ullerup as Kathleen Breezewood/Desiree
 Alison Araya as Captain Rivera
 David Lewis as Jonathan Breezewood
 Daniel Diemer as Rand Morgan
 Barry W.Levy as Paul Morgan
 Aaron Paul Stewart as Billy
 Amira Anderson as Bookstore Manager
 April Telek as Lisa Clark
 Jack Armstrong as Richie
 Nikki Bryce as Richie’s Mom
 Matt Bellefleur as Lawrence Mark
 Mitra Suri as Carol Hayes/Roxanne
 Orphée Ladouceur-Nguyen as Mary Beth Morrison/Raven
 Jesse Vlahovic as Grocery Store Kid
 Miguel Castillo as Dr. Carmona
 Leslie Kwan as Forensics
 Michael Q. Adams as Catholic Priest
 Trace Schurko as Kevin
 Lynn Colliar as Reporter

Production
In January 2021, it was announced Alyssa Milano would star in a feature film adaption of Nora Roberts’ romance thriller Brazen Virtue with Monika Mitchell directing.

Following the announcement of Milano's casting as Grace, Nora Roberts' Facebook page was inundated with negative responses from sections of her fan base who were critical of Milano's role in the #MeToo movement and criticism of Donald Trump's administration. Roberts was quoted:

Release
The movie was released on Netflix's service January 13, 2022.

Reception

The review aggregator website Rotten Tomatoes reported an approval rating of 18% based on 17 reviews, with an average rating of 3.3/10.

References

External links
 
 

2022 films
2022 thriller films
2020s American films
2020s English-language films
American thriller films
English-language Netflix original films
Films based on American thriller novels
Films based on romance novels
Films based on works by Nora Roberts
Films produced by Peter Guber
Mandalay Pictures films